99 River Street is a 1953 film noir directed by Phil Karlson and starring John Payne and Evelyn Keyes. It also features Brad Dexter, Frank Faylen, and Peggie Castle. The screenplay is by Robert Smith, based on a short story by George Zuckerman.  The film was produced by Edward Small, with cinematography by Franz Planer.

Plot
Ernie Driscoll is a former boxer who, after sustaining an injury in the ring severe enough to force him to give up prize-fighting, is a New York taxi driver.

His wife, Pauline, unhappy living a hard-up life, is having an affair with well-heeled jewel thief Victor Rawlins. An arrangement Rawlins made, to be paid for a batch of diamonds he has stolen, falls through; his fence indicates it is the presence of Pauline that has impeded the deal. In an effort to rekindle it, Rawlins kills Pauline and attempts to frame Driscoll for the murder.

With the help of a female acquaintance, Driscoll tries to track down Rawlins before the criminal leaves the country.

Cast

 John Payne as Ernie Driscoll
 Evelyn Keyes as Linda James 
 Brad Dexter as Victor Rawlins
 Frank Faylen as Stan Hogan
 Peggie Castle as Pauline Driscoll
 Jay Adler as Christopher
 Jack Lambert as Mickey
 Glenn Langan as Lloyd Morgan
 Eddy Waller as Pop Durkee
 John Day as Bud
 Ian Wolfe as Waldo Daggett
 Peter Leeds as Nat Finley
 William Tannen as director
 Gene Reynolds as Chuck
 Paul Bryar as bartender

Source:

Cast notes:
In 1961, John Payne's acting career was interrupted when he was hit by a car while crossing Madison Avenue in New York City. Although he survived the accident thanks to surgical intervention and lengthy rehabilitation, his film and television appearances after his attempted comeback were sporadic, and ended in the 1970s.
Peggie Castle's acting career began in 1950 when she – along with Piper Laurie, Barbara Bates, Mona Freeman and Barbara Payton – was touted as one of that year's "Baby Stars".

Production
The rights to George Zuckerman's short story "Crosstown" were originally purchased by producer Albert Zugsmith, who sold them to Edward Small. Actress Linda Darnell was Small's first choice to play the female lead played in the film by Evelyn Keyes. The film was originally known as Crosstown. The name was changed two months before the film's release.

Reception
The New York Times film critic gave the film a negative review, writing that the film "...is one of those tasteless melodramas peopled with unpleasant hoods, two-timing blondes and lots of sequences of what purports to be everyday life in the underworld. In this stale rehash, John Payne is a cabbie seething with dreams of what he might have been in the boxing world ... To say that this film is offensive would be kind; to point out that it induces an irritated boredom would be accurate. The defendants in this artistic felony are Robert Smith, the scenarist, and Phil Karlson, the director. It is interesting to ponder how Mr. Karlson managed to slip some objectionable scenes past the production code. Maybe it was just artistic license."

Modern critics gave the film positive reviews, Dave Kehr writing that "Phil Karlson directed this low-budget independent film noir in 1953, and it's an example of the kind of humble brilliance that often emerged from the American genre cinema."

Martin Scorsese and Jonathan Rosenbaum cited it in some lists of best and favourite movies that they have submitted over the years.

References

External links

 
 
 
 99 River Street informational site and DVD review at DVD Beaver (includes images)
 

1953 films
1953 crime drama films
American crime drama films
American black-and-white films
American boxing films
1950s English-language films
Film noir
Films directed by Phil Karlson
Films scored by Emil Newman
Films set in New York City
United Artists films
Films produced by Edward Small
Films scored by Arthur Lange
1950s American films